Edosa opsigona is a moth of the family Tineidae first described by Edward Meyrick in 1911. It is found in Sri Lanka.

Male genitalia with long, apically bifid uncus. Apex pointed. Saccus low. Juxta small and cap like. Valvae elongated and broad. Saccular margin almost straight with hook-like process at the base. Aedeagus long. Wings are golden colored.

References

Moths of Asia
Moths described in 1911
Tineidae
Perissomasticinae